Richard McClure Scarry (June 5, 1919 – April 30, 1994) was an American children's author and illustrator who published over 300 books with total sales of over 100 million worldwide. He is best known for his Best Ever book series that take place primarily in the fictional town of Busytown, "which is populated by friendly and helpful resident [animals...such as] Mr. Frumble, Huckle Cat, Mr. Fixit, Lowly Worm, and others..."  The series spawned a media franchise.

Early life and education
Scarry was born in Boston, Massachusetts to Mary McClure and John Scarry Sr., who were of Irish-American ancestry and ran a small department store chain. Scarry had four siblings: older brother John Jr., younger sister, Barbara, and younger brothers, Edward and Leo. The family enjoyed a comfortable life at their 32 Melville Avenue home in the Dorchester neighborhood, even during the Great Depression.

Following high school, Scarry enrolled in Boston Business School, but dropped out in 1938. He then studied at the School of the Museum of Fine Arts in Boston, the Archipenko Art School in Woodstock, New York, and the Eliot O'Hara Watercolor School in Goose Rocks, Kennebunkport, Maine, before being drafted into the U.S. Army in 1942.

Career
After entering the Army, Scarry was assigned to the military's radio repair school. After a small success in that trade, he was chosen to paint a large sign and then made an art director after receiving a medical dispensation "from strenuous physical activity". Later he became "Editor and Writer of Publications for the Information and Morale Services Section of the Allied Force Headquarters", served in North Africa, and was discharged from the Army in 1946. After the war, Scarry worked in magazine and advertising in New York City, including a very brief stint at Vogue. In 1949, he made a career breakthrough with Little Golden Books.

Scarry's most famous series of books was about Busytown and revolved around anthropomorphic animals. While his books are largely populated by common animal species, he proved to be quite adept at giving human characteristics to a seemingly endless number of creatures, machines, and creations. Many of his later illustrations feature characters in traditional Swiss clothing and show architecturally correct drawings of half-timber houses.

Scarry was a disciplined worker. Scarry was closely associated with mass-market children's publisher Ole Risom. They worked together on dozens of books, including I Am a Bunny, which Risom wrote and Scarry illustrated. First published in 1963, it is still in print. Risom and Walter Retan also co-wrote the illustrated biography, The Busy, Busy World of Richard Scarry. In the 1980s and 1990s, many of Scarry's Best Ever books were produced as animated videos and aired during TLC's now-defunct Ready Set Learn block. The Busytown books were also adapted into an animated series, The Busy World of Richard Scarry, which was produced by Canada-based CINAR (now WildBrain) and Paramount Television and aired on the pay-TV channel Showtime from 1993 to 1997. It reran in the late 1990s on Nickelodeon and its sister channel Noggin (now Nick Jr.). A further animated series, Busytown Mysteries, was commissioned by CBC from the Cookie Jar Group (the successor to CINAR) in 2007, and airs on the Kids' CBC morning program block.

Busytown was featured at the Carnegie Museums of Pittsburgh from June 13 to September 8, 2002, in an interactive exhibit, Richard Scarry's Busytown. His books were popular with children throughout the world with over 100 million copies sold.

From 1976 to around 1978, Playskool planned Richard Scarry's Puzzletown, a series of toy sets featuring plastic figures of Scarry characters and vehicles as well as cardboard scenery that the child could set up in a grid of trenches in a plastic base.

Changes to Best Word Book Ever 

Books by Richard Scarry were revised over the course of their several editions, often to make them conform to changing social values. His Best Word Book Ever, which first introduced in 1963, was issued in 1980 as a "new revised edition" which altered images and text to remove material which could be perceived as offensive due to gender, ethnic, or religious misconceptions. Characters in "cowboy" or "Indian" costumes were either removed or given nondescript clothing. Moral and religious elements and depictions of gender roles were altered or removed (for instance, a menorah was added into a Christmas scene, and the words "he comes promptly when he is called to breakfast", referring to a father bear, were changed to "he goes to the kitchen to eat his breakfast"). Characters engaged in activities reflecting traditional gender roles were altered so as to make the scenes more gender-neutral (e.g., a male character was added into a kitchen scene, a cowboy was replaced with a female gardener and a female scientist, the phrase "pretty stewardess" was changed to "flight attendant", and male characters engaged in traditionally masculine activities such as driving a steamroller were altered into female characters by the addition of hair bows or pink flowers, etc.). In some cases these changes necessitated removing whole sections altogether, including the "Out West" section, the "buildings" section (which had depicted a church, a cathedral, and a French Foreign Legion fortress), and sections on painting and music making.

Scarry's papers and drawings are collected in the University of Connecticut archives.

Personal life and family
While working as a free-lance illustrator, Scarry met Patricia "Patsy" Murphy, a writer of children's textbooks, when they collaborated on one such book, and they married in 1948. She is credited with writing many of the stories in his subsequent children's books, such as Good Night, Little Bear, The Bunny Book, and The Fishing Cat. Before moving to Europe, the family lived on a farm in Ridgefield, Connecticut.

In 1972, Scarry and his wife moved to Lausanne, Switzerland, and in 1974 bought a chalet in nearby Gstaad, where Scarry enjoyed spending time with his adult son, Richard Scarry Jr.; skiing; coin collecting; and sailing.

Scarry's son is also an illustrator who sometimes works under the name Huck Scarry in his father's style. He moved to Vienna, Austria, and has four children.

Death
On April 30, 1994, in Gstaad, Switzerland, Scarry died of a heart attack, caused by complications from esophageal cancer, at the age of 74.

Bibliography 
Scarry began his book career in 1949 as an illustrator of books by other people, specifically Kathryn & Byron Jackson's Mouse's House.  He continued as only or primarily an illustrator through 1955, then began turning out original books.

His titles, in order of publication, are:

 Golden Books

 Random House

 Find Your ABC's, 1973 
 Please and Thank You Book, 1973
 Cars and Trucks and Things That Go, 1974
 Best Rainy Day Book Ever, 1974 
 European Word Book, 1974

 Golden Books

 Animal Nursery Tales, 1975  
 Great Steamboat Mystery, 1975 
 Best Counting Book Ever, 1975

 Random House

 Golden Books

 Random House

Many of these titles are preceded by his name ("Richard Scarry's ..."), and may be so listed in library and booksellers' databases.  Some (Pie Rats Ahoy!, Best Mistake Ever! and The Early Bird) were published under the Beginner Books (Grolier and Early Moments only) imprint, and others (Chuckle with Huckle! and Other Easy-to-Read Funny Stories and The Worst Helper Ever [Early Moments only]) as Bright and Early Books, although all are targeted at beginning readers.  Scarry also illustrated a 1963 edition of The Fables of La Fontaine, and in 1993 put his own stamp on a series of familiar nursery stories (Little Red Riding Hood, The Little Red Hen, The Three Bears, The Three Little Pigs).

Stories made to video 
Golden Book Videos:

 The Gingerbread Man and Other Nursery Stories (Golden Book 1986)
 Old MacDonald's Farm and Other Animal Tales (Golden Book 1986)
 Get Ready for School (Golden Step Ahead 1986, 1991)

Random House Videos: (by 2006 these were taken out of print)

Richard Scarry's:

 Best ABC Video Ever! (Random House 1989)
 Best Counting Video Ever! (Random House 1989)
 Best Busy People Video Ever! (Random House 1993)
 Best Learning Songs Video Ever! (Random House 1993)
 Best Silly Stories and Songs Video Ever! (Random House 1994)
 Best Sing-Along Mother Goose Video Ever! (Random House 1994)

PolyGram Videos:

The Busy World of Richard Scarry:

 The Three Fishermen and other stories (Cinar 1993)
 The Best Birthday Present Ever and 2 other stories (Cinar 1993)
 Sergeant Murphy's Day Off and 2 other stories (Cinar 1993)
 The Busiest Firefighters Ever and 2 other stories (Cinar 1993)
 Mr. Frumble's New Cars and 2 other stories (Cinar 1993)
 The Snowstorm and 2 other stories (Cinar 1993)
 A Trip To The Moon and 2 other stories (Cinar 1993)
 Summer Picnic and 2 other stories (Cinar 1993)
 The Best Babysitter Ever and 2 other stories (Cinar 1993)
 Sally's First Day At School and 2 other stories (Cinar 1993, 1994, 1995)
 New Friend On The Block and 2 other stories (Cinar 1993, 1994, 1995)

Richard Scarry's:

 The Best Christmas Present Ever and 2 other stories (Cinar 1993, 1994, 1995)
 The Best Birthday Party Ever and 2 other stories (Cinar 1993, 1994, 1995)
 Now I Know My 123's and 2 other stories (Cinar 1993, 1994, 1995)
 The Best Spelling Bee Ever and 2 other stories (Cinar 1993, 1994, 1995)
 The Best Christmas Surprise Ever and 2 other stories (Cinar 1993, 1994, 1995)
 Be My Valentine and 2 other stories (Cinar 1993, 1994, 1995)
 The First Easter Egg Ever and 2 other stories (Cinar 1993, 1994, 1995)
 Practice Makes Perfect and 2 other stories (Cinar 1993, 1994, 1995)
 Making Progress and 2 other stories (Cinar 1993, 1994, 1995)
 The First Halloween Ever and 2 other stories (Cinar 1993, 1994, 1995)

References

External links 
 
 A Guide to the Richard Scarry Papers at the University of Connecticut Archives & Special Collections
 

1919 births
1994 deaths
American people of Irish descent
American writers of Irish descent
American children's writers
People from Ridgefield, Connecticut
Writers from Boston
Writers who illustrated their own writing
United States Army soldiers
United States Army personnel of World War II
Artists from Boston
Writers from Connecticut
Artists from Connecticut
American emigrants to Switzerland
School of the Museum of Fine Arts at Tufts alumni